Slovak Uprising may refer to:
 Slovak Uprising 1848-1849, Slovak Volunteer Campaigns against Magyar (i.e. ethnic Hungarian) domination in Upper Hungary (present-day Slovakia), within the 1848-49 revolutions in the Habsburg Monarchy. 
 Slovak National Uprising, an armed insurrection organized by the Slovak resistance movement during World War II (1944)